The crested porcupine (Hystrix cristata), also known as the African crested porcupine, is a species of rodent in the family Hystricidae native to Italy, North Africa and sub-Saharan Africa.

Characteristics 

It is one of the largest rodents in the world.

Almost the entire body is covered with bristles which are either dark brown or black and rather coarse. This mammal is recognizable by the quills that run along the head, nape, and back that can be raised into a crest, hence the name crested porcupine. These sturdier quills are used, for the most part, for defense and are usually marked with light and dark bands which alternate; these are not firmly attached. This porcupine has a short tail which has rattle quills at the end. The rattle quills broaden at the terminal end and the broad portion is hollow with thin walls. When these quills are vibrated, they produce a hiss-like rattle.

The front feet of the crested porcupine have four developed and clawed digits with a regressed thumb, the rear feet have five. The paws have naked and padded soles and have a plantigrade gait. The ears are external and both the eyes and ears are very small with long vibrissae on its head. The skull is distinctive in many ways: first, the infraorbital foramen is greatly enlarged so portions of the masseter extend through it and attach from the frontal side surface of the snout; second, the angular process is inflected on the lower jaw, and third, the nasal cavity is enlarged. Prominent pockets create enlarged areas of attachment for chewing muscles. Collar bones are very much reduced, and one incisor, one premolar and three molars are present in each quadrant. The male's penis is directed caudally when not erect.

Distribution and habitat 
The crested porcupine is found in Italy, North Africa, and sub-Saharan Africa. In the Mediterranean, it is known from mainland Italy and the island of Sicily, Morocco, Algeria, and Tunisia; they are also recorded in Ghana, Libya and along the Egyptian coast. The porcupine was thought to have been introduced to Italy by the Romans, but fossil and subfossil remains suggest it may have been present in Europe in the Upper Pleistocene.

The crested porcupine is native to Algeria, Benin, Burkina Faso, Burundi, Cameroon, Central African Republic, Chad, Côte d'Ivoire, Democratic Republic of the Congo, Eritrea, Ethiopia, Gambia, Ghana, Djibouti, Guinea, Guinea-Bissau, Italy, Kenya, Liberia, Libya, Mali, Mauritania, Morocco, Nigeria, Rwanda, Senegal, Sierra Leone, Somalia, Sudan, South Sudan, Tanzania, Togo, Tunisia and Uganda. It may be locally extinct in Egypt.

Behaviour and ecology
The crested porcupine is a terrestrial mammal; it very seldom climbs trees, but can swim.  It is nocturnal and monogamous. The crested porcupine takes care of the young for an extended period, and small family groups consist of the adult pair and young of various ages. In defense, when disturbed, they raise and fan their quills to make themselves look bigger. If continually bothered, the crested porcupine will stamp its feet, whirr the quills, and charge the disturber back end first trying to stab the enemy with the thicker, shorter quills. These attacks are known to have killed lions, leopards, hyenas, and even humans.

Crested porcupines have been known to collect thousands of bones that they find at night. They are mostly nocturnal, and they may come upon the skeletons of animals.  They collect these bones and store them in an underground chamber or cave.

Diet and digestion 
The crested porcupine is for the most part herbivorous, eating roots, bulbs, and leaves, but occasionally they do consume insects, small vertebrates, and carrion. To ingest calcium and sharpen incisors, they often gnaw on bones. These animals often travel long distances looking for food. They have high crowned teeth that grind plant tissues which are digested in the stomach, and the undigested fibers are retained in an enlarged appendix and anterior large intestine, where they are broken down by microorganisms.

Reproduction 
Most of what is known about reproduction in the crested porcupine comes from individuals in captivity. Usually, female crested porcupines have one litter every year. One or two well developed young are born in a chamber within the burrow that is usually lined with grass, after on average a 66-day gestation period. They leave the den after one week. At this time, the spines begin to harden. Crested porcupines reach adult weight at one to two years and are often sexually mature just before then. Breeding occurs throughout the year.

Local and indigenous names
In Italian: porcospino or istrice
In the Tigrinya language:  (qinfiz)
In Amharic: 
In the Akan language: 
In the Oromo language:

References

External links 

http://www.wildafrica.cz/images/animals/413_dikobraz-obecny.jpg

http://stoneplus.cst.cmich.edu/zoogems/porc%20quills-HatchNecklace.jpg

crested porcupine
Mammals of Africa
Mammals of Ethiopia
Mammals of Uganda
Fauna of Italy
crested porcupine
crested porcupine
Rodents of Europe